Outjo Airport  is an airport serving Outjo, in the Kunene Region of Namibia.

See also

List of airports in Namibia
Transport in Namibia

References

External links
 OurAirports - Namibia
 Outjo Airport
 OpenStreetMap - Outjo

Airports in Namibia